Novi Tabor is an abandoned settlement in the Municipality of Semič in southern Slovenia. The area is part of the traditional region of Lower Carniola and is now included in the Southeast Slovenia Statistical Region. Its territory is now part of the village of Črmošnjice.

History
Novi Tabor was a village inhabited by Gottschee Germans. It was founded during the era of Ottoman raids in the 16th century. It had seven houses in 1931. The original inhabitants were expelled in the fall of 1941. Italian troops burned the village during the Rog Offensive in the summer of 1942 and it was never rebuilt.

References

External links
Novi Tabor on Geopedia
Pre–World War II map of Novi Tabor with oeconyms and family names

Former populated places in the Municipality of Semič